, also known as Chip Tanaka, is a Japanese musician, composer, sound designer, and executive who pioneered chiptune music. He is best known as one of Nintendo's in-house composers during the 8- and 16-bit era of video games. Tanaka also had a role in designing and programming the Famicom and Game Boy audio hardware, along with the NES Zapper, Game Boy Camera, and Game Boy Printer.

Tanaka's soundtrack credits include Metroid (1986), Kid Icarus (1986), Super Mario Land (1989), Tetris (1989), Mother (1989), Dr. Mario (1990), and EarthBound (1994). As the president of Creatures, he continues to be involved with Nintendo, more specifically the Pokémon franchise.

Biography

Early life
Born to a schoolteacher mother who had Tanaka undergo piano lessons, Tanaka recounted that he first began paying serious attention to music while in elementary school, and attempted to form a band during that time. His first band was formed when he was in middle school, a Beatles and Elton John cover group, which sometimes performed concerts at his school. He has held a longstanding obsession with reggae music. In his teens, he was also in a reggae band, which was known variously by the names the Shampoos or Roots Rockers. For the music event "Reggae Sunsplash" held in Osaka, the Shampoos were an opening act for Sly and Robbie on more than one occasion. Tanaka did meet the duo during those times. On The Shampoos, Tanaka described it as an obscure local band which did gigs in Tokyo about once or twice a year, and that it was "never a formal thing".

Employment at Nintendo
In 1980, after graduating from university with a degree in electronic engineering, Tanaka successfully applied for a job at Nintendo as a sound designer. He did not initially want to be an engineer, but Nintendo were accordingly scouting for "different sounds or toys or something at the time. I thought toys would be relatively stress-free, so I applied." The first game Tanaka worked on was Space Firebird (1980), where Tanaka was composer and constructed a new sound chip for particular sound effects. Following this, Tanaka worked on Donkey Kong (1981), providing the sound effects for Mario's footsteps and jumps. Usually, the same sound effect was repeated across many different actions, but Tanaka's approach differed where he invented subtle variations. He attempted to insert voice synthesis for the game's damsel-in-distress, but the idea was vetoed by then-Nintendo president Hiroshi Yamauchi's daughter, who did not feel that the sample sounded like the exclamation "help me!". Tanaka noted that he learned "a lot" from series creator Shigeru Miyamoto due to his perfectionism and "level of commitment".

Donkey Kong 3 (1983) was the first game where Tanaka acted both as composer and sound effects designer. His approach to game composition carried on from his dub obsession: "For instance, if you listen to the music in Wrecking Crew (1985), you could recognize that some parts are drum and bass only. So that turned out to be an idea for working around the limitations of the game software. I figured that, to get the most out of the game music, a dub-based structure would be a really great solution. I'd play the melody in some parts, then cut it off and insert a part with just drums and bass, and vice versa. No one else was doing it, but it was what I wanted to do." Tanaka described what he remembered as a "typical day" at Nintendo in the brief period following the release of the Famicom home game console:

While working full-time at Nintendo on two or three games a year, and sometimes two simultaneously, Tanaka continued playing gigs in Osaka and Tokyo with the Shampoos. Sometime in the late 1980s, they recorded the 45 rpm "Thunder Dub" which prominently sampled the opening drumbeat from the Beatles' "Sgt. Pepper's Lonely Hearts Club Band (Reprise)" (1967). Tanaka did not personally see a difference between the music he composed for video games and the music he composed in his off time. For Metroid (1986), Tanaka acknowledged that games were becoming more complex, and his scores were becoming more like a film's, desiring in Metroid not to "repeat the same game-melody cliches," although he recalls that the game's soundtrack was not well-received within Nintendo because of its dark atmosphere. He was inspired by the film Birdy (1984) to create a game score that was dark until the very end, where the player would finally receive music with a strong melody. Despite disapproval from his Nintendo colleagues, Tanaka was allowed full creative freedom on projects, and even had a fluctuating role in influencing some games' content and play style. He remembers Nintendo's strict, repeated criticisms over the amount of "fun" a game would have, but that there was no financial pressure in creating games, nor were there sales quotas to meet. At the time of Dr. Mario (1990), Tanaka began observing an increasing number of "serious" game composers who had graduated from music schools. Dr. Mario was thus the first time Tanaka had asserted his musical personality in a game.

Tanaka was one of "about five or six" Nintendo-based developers who designed the Game Boy, researching and creating its audio hardware. He was inspired to develop the Game Boy Camera from a product called ViewCam that was popular at the time — Tanaka also ran experiments on the possibility of watching television via the Game Boy.

Creatures Inc.
At the advice of EarthBound (1994) co-worker Tsunekazu Ishihara, Tanaka would join Creatures as a guest composer, where he would end up composing dozens of songs for the first Japanese Pokémon anime and various Pokémon promotional releases. Despite the fact that his themes were not used in the West, they inspired best-selling singles and albums in Japan due to their popularity there. Tanaka was eventually forbidden by Nintendo to continue to write more songs for the anime due to their policy of not allowing employees to work for other companies, so he resigned at Nintendo and joined Creatures full-time in 1999.

Tanaka succeeded Ishihara to become the president of Creatures in 2001. Starting in the late 2000s, Tanaka began to perform at Japanese dance clubs under the name "Chip Tanaka". The moniker was suggested by a foreign acquaintance, as Tanaka thought "Hip Tanaka" was too attached to his time at Nintendo.

After the death of Satoru Iwata in 2015, Tanaka wrote a chiptune track titled "Dedicated to Satoru Iwata" as a tribute.

Influences
Tanaka has said that his tastes in his youth were typical of the time, listening to artists such as the Beatles and the Carpenters. His first exposure to dub music was through the 1978 album Negrea Love Dub by Linval Thompson while eating pasta at a restaurant with live music in Kyoto. It was the record's use of exaggerated tape delay which astounded Tanaka, who stopped eating every time he heard it occur: "I thought 'Is this music sick?' But the more I listened to it, that groove with the bass line and the mixer... I think the mixer takes full control of it, directly and instinctively. When I felt it, I thought 'This is amazing.' I was totally hooked." Tanaka explained his fascination with reggae music and his application for it in his game scores: "It wasn't proactive on my part. I was a music lover that happened to be working at Nintendo. ... The reason I like reggae, especially dub, is because there actually is vocal and guitar on it, let's say, but in the essence, it's strictly driven by drums and bass. That's what I love about it the most. ... I think I like how there's this raw aspect to it. The gritty, raw quality of the sound, let's say. That really caught my ears. And that deep bass sound, the "buuu..." That was something I never heard before in rock music. It drove me like no other genre in music."

Among specific musical influences, Tanaka has cited Brian Wilson, Randy Newman, Stackridge, Yabby U, the Flying Lizards, Prince, Lalo Rodriguez, My Bloody Valentine, Frank Zappa, Keiichi Suzuki, Hal Willner's various artists compilations, Sly Dunbar, Jah Wobble, and the Slits. The "hip" in "Hip Tanaka" came from hip hop, with his favorite artist of the genre being A Tribe Called Quest.

Works

References

External links
  
 

1957 births
Chiptune musicians
Dub musicians
Japanese chief executives
Japanese composers
Japanese male composers
Japanese reggae musicians
Japanese video game producers
Living people
Metroid
Nintendo people
Musicians from Kyoto
Video game composers